In enzymology, a chlorate reductase is an enzyme that catalyzes the chemical reaction

AH2 + chlorate  A + H2O + chlorite

Thus, the two substrates of this enzyme are a reduced electron acceptor (denoted AH2) and chlorate, whereas its 3 products are an oxidized electron acceptor (denoted A), water, and chlorite.  It is closely related to the enzyme perchlorate reductase which reduces both chlorate and perchlorate.

This enzyme belongs to the family of oxidoreductases.  The systematic name of this enzyme class is chlorite:acceptor oxidoreductase. This enzyme is also called chlorate reductase C.

References 

 

EC 1.97.1
Enzymes of unknown structure